State Route 181 (abbreviated SR 181) is a primary state highway running through Lake, Dyer, and Lauderdale counties in Tennessee.  This highway traverses very sparsely populated areas and is located entirely within the flood plains of the Mississippi River, Obion River and Forked Deer River.  SR 181 is constructed as a modern two-lane facility with paved shoulders and a  speed limit throughout its length.  Prior to its designation as a state highway (and subsequent raising of the levee), it was a narrow gravel road.  It is constructed atop the "Big Levee" in Dyer County and is used as a primary defense against floodwaters from the Mississippi River itself, however, floodwaters from the Obion River often back up on the eastern side of the levee.  This highway doesn't pass through any municipalities or unincorporated communities.  The area is a popular destination for fishermen and hunters.

Route description
The entire length of SR 181 is signed as the Great River Road and also carries a Tennessee Scenic Parkway designation.  This state route carries both a primary and secondary designation.

Major intersections

References

181
181